The Copa del Generalísimo 1975 Final was the 73rd final of the King's Cup. It was played at the Vicente Calderón Stadium in Madrid on 5 July 1975, Real Madrid defeating Atlético Madrid in a penalty shoot-out after a 0–0 draw.

Details

References

1975
1974–75 in Spanish football
Atlético Madrid matches
Association football penalty shoot-outs
Real Madrid CF matches
Madrid Derby matches